Kadievo is a village in Southern Bulgaria, located in Rodopi Municipality, Plovdiv Province. As of 2020 the village has a population of 1057 people.

Geography 
Kadievo is close to the second largest river, streaming from the Rodope Mountain, Vacha river. The river is known for its clear waters as it does not pass near any productive facilities. The village is located 6 kilometers away from Plovdiv. The railway line from Plovdiv to Sofia passes through the village.

Infrastructure 
The village has a school and a medical facility cabinet has been opened in 2021 in the school, that the local people can attend. There are children 58 active students in the school as of 2021.

There is a vineyard and a wine production facility near the area of the village, on the road to Plovdiv, where some of the people work. The wine cellars are often visited by tourists during the Summer months.

Ethnic division 
As of 2011, the ethnic composition in the village was as follows:

Gallery

References

Villages in Plovdiv Province